Olaniyi "Nee" Sobomehin [OH-la-nee-yee Shuh-BO-muh-heen] (born October 11, 1984) is a former American football fullback. He played college football at Portland State. He was signed by the New Orleans Saints as an undrafted free agent in 2008. After getting injured, he spent his rookie season on Injured Reserve.

Early years
Sobomehin was born in Portland, Oregon. He attended The Catlin Gabel School in Portland, where he lettered in basketball and track. Because his high school did not field a football team, he played for Cleveland High School in Portland.

College career
Sobomehin played in 19 games with eight starts after transferring to Portland State. He was PSU's leading rusher as a senior, gaining 515 yards on 110 carries with eight TDs.

External links
New Orleans Saints bio
Oregon State Beavers bio

American football fullbacks
Oregon State Beavers football players
Portland State Vikings football players
New Orleans Saints players
Players of American football from Portland, Oregon
1984 births
Living people
Catlin Gabel School alumni